Malja Dasht (also Romanized as Maljā Dasht; also known as Marjā Dasht) is a village in Kojid Rural District, Rankuh District, Amlash County, Gilan Province, Iran. At the 2006 census, its population was 38, in 15 families.

References 

Populated places in Amlash County